Physopleurella is a genus of bugs in the family Lyctocoridae. There are at least three described species in Physopleurella.

Species
These three species belong to the genus Physopleurella:
 Physopleurella armata (Poppius, 1909) g
 Physopleurella floridana Blatchley, 1925 i c g
 Physopleurella mundula (White, 1877) i c g b
Data sources: i = ITIS, c = Catalogue of Life, g = GBIF, b = Bugguide.net

References

Further reading

 
 

Lyctocoridae genera
Articles created by Qbugbot
Lyctocoridae